Nebiriau may refer to:

 Nebiriau I, Egyptian pharaoh, reigned 1627-1601 BC
 Nebiriau II, Egyptian pharaoh who succeeded Nebiriau I